Capellinia fustifera is a species of sea slug or nudibranch, a marine gastropod mollusc in the family Eubranchidae.

Distribution
This species was described from Bohüslan, Norway. It has also been reported from the Atlantic coast of France and the coasts of Great Britain and Ireland as Eubranchus doriae.

References

Eubranchidae
Gastropods described in 1846